Mikhail Yershov is the name of:
 Mikhail Aleksandrovich Yershov (born 1986), Russian footballer

 Mikhail Yershov (actor), Russian movie actor who acted in Moscow-Cassiopeia and Teens in the Universe